
AD 80 (LXXX) was a leap year starting on Saturday (link will display the full calendar) of the Julian calendar. At the time, it was known as the Year of the Consulship of Augustus and Domitianus (or, less frequently, year 833 Ab urbe condita). The denomination AD 80 for this year has been used since the early medieval period, when the Anno Domini calendar era became the prevalent method in Europe for naming years.

Events

By place

Roman Empire 
 Emperor Titus completes and inaugurates the Colosseum with 100 days of games.
 The earliest stage of Lullingstone Roman villa is built.
 The Roman occupation of Britain reaches the River Tyne–Solway Firth frontier area. Gnaeus Julius Agricola creates a fleet for the conquest of Caledonia; he finally proves that Britannia is an island.
 Legio II Adiutrix is stationed at Lindum Colonia (modern Lincoln). The city is an important settlement for retired Roman legionaries.
 The original Roman Pantheon is destroyed in a fire, along with many other buildings.
 The Eifel Aqueduct is constructed to bring water  from the Eifel region to Colonia Claudia Ara Agrippinensum (modern Cologne).
 An epidemic afflicts Rome.

Asia 
 Some 30,000 Asian tribesmen migrate from the steppes to the west with 40,000 horses and 100,000 cattle, joining with Iranian tribesmen and with Mongols from the Siberian forests to form a group that will be known in Europe as the Huns.
 King Pasa becomes ruler of the Korean kingdom of Silla.

By topic

Art and Science 
 The aeolipile, the first steam engine, is described by Hero of Alexandria.

Religion 
 The Gospel of Luke and Acts of the Apostles are written (approximate date).
</onlyinclude>

Births 
 Aspasius, Greek philosopher and writer (approximate date)
 Aśvaghoṣa, Indian philosopher and poet (d. c. 150)
 Yin, Chinese empress of the Han Dynasty (d. 103)

Deaths 
 Kujula Kadphises, Kushan prince (approximate date)
 Lucius Vipstanus Messalla, Roman politician
 Philip the Apostle, Christian apostle and martyr
 Talhae of Silla, Korean ruler of Silla
 Vologases II, king of the Parthian Empire
 Zhao Xi, Chinese politician (b. AD 4)

References 

0080